Anytime at All is the second album by American rock band Banyan, founded by Stephen Perkins of Jane's Addiction and Porno for Pyros fame, and David Turin. The record features nearly two dozens players, half of which are well-known.  Like their first album, this one is dedicated to Perkins' deceased brother, Marc. The album is more upbeat and organic-sounding than the band's previous work and the songs are much more varied.

Track listing 
 "Buzzards & Worms" (Stephen Perkins, Martin LeNoble) – 3:34
 "Justine" (Stephen Perkins, William Waldman, Rob Wasserman) – 5:04
 "Steel Head" (Stephen Perkins, Ross Rice, William Waldman, Rob Wasserman, Bad Azz) – 3:45
 "Looped + Faded" (Dave Aron) – 4:58
 "Grease the System" (Stephen Perkins, Flea, John Frusciante, Joey Klaparda, Mike Watt, William Waldman) – 4:23
 "La Sirena" (Stephen Perkins, Mike Watt, John Frusciante) – 3:10
 "Cactus Soil" (Stephen Perkins) – 2:15
 "Keep the Change" (Stephen Perkins, Cindy Juarez, Tommy D., William Waldman, Rob Wasserman) – 4:45
 "Lovin' Them Pounds" (Mike Watt) – 4:39
 "Early Bird" (Stephen Perkins, Buckethead) – 2:30
 "Sputnik" (Stephen Perkins, Buckethead, Mike Watt) – 6:33
 "The Apple and the Seed" (Stephen Perkins, William Waldman, Rob Wasserman, Dave Aron, Ross Rice, Clint Wagner) – 14:54
 "New Old Hat" (Nels Cline) – 7:18 (8:33 including Early Bird outro)
 "Untitled" (hidden track) (Banyan) – 0:04

Personnel 
 Stephen Perkins – drums & percussion
 Willie Waldman – trumpet (tracks 1-3, 6, 8, 9, 11-13)
 Rob Wasserman – upright bass (1-3, 8, 12)
 Dave Aron – clarinet, programming (1, 2, 4, 9, 12)
 Martyn LeNoble – bass (1)
 Flea – bass (5)
 Mike Watt – bass (6, 9, 11, 13)
 Clint Wagner – guitar (1-3, 12)
 Patrick Butler – guitar (4, 5)
 John Frusciante – guitar (5, 6)
 Jason Burke – guitar (8)
 Nels Cline – guitar (9, 13)
 Buckethead – guitar (10, 11)
 Ross Rice – keyboards (1-3, 12)
 Stafford Floyd – keyboards (4, 12, 13)
 Bad Azz – vocals (3)
 Joey Klaparda – vocals (6)
 Cindy Juarez Perkins – vocals (8)
 Tommy D. Daugherty – programming (8)
 Michael Mattioli – saxophone (2)
 Leo Chelyapov – clarinet (13)
 Tom Lemke – sound EFX (8, 11)

References 

Banyan (band) albums
1999 albums